Jasminum calophyllum is a species of jasmine, in the family Oleaceae.

References

calophyllum
Flora of the Indian subcontinent
Plants described in 1837
Taxa named by Nathaniel Wallich